Campodoro is a comune (municipality) in the Province of Padua in the Italian region Veneto, located about  west of Venice and about  northwest of Padua.   

Campodoro borders the following municipalities: Camisano Vicentino, Grisignano di Zocco, Mestrino, Piazzola sul Brenta, Villafranca Padovana.

Twin towns
Campodoro is twinned with:

  Douradina, Mato Grosso do Sul, Brazil, since 1988

References

Cities and towns in Veneto